The women's Super-G competition of the 2014 Winter Paralympics was held at Rosa Khutor Alpine Resort near Krasnaya Polyana, Russia. The competition was scheduled for 10 March 2014.

Medal table

Visually impaired
In the visually impaired super-G, the athlete with a visual impairment has a sighted guide. The two skiers are considered a team, and dual medals are awarded.

Standing

Sitting

See also
Alpine skiing at the 2014 Winter Paralympics
Alpine skiing at the 2014 Winter Olympics

References

Women's super-G
Para